The Three Revolutions Exhibition is a museum located in North Korea. The exhibition primarily showcases the three revolutions of Kim Il-sung: ideological, technical, and cultural. It is in the Ryonmot-dong area, and its grounds showcase the accomplishments of Juche ideological education, industrial development and agricultural improvement. The central building has a shape resembling a spherical planet with rings, similar to the planet of Saturn. The dome itself also houses a planetarium. In the complex, there are six exhibits which detail North Korea's advances in electronics, heavy industry, agriculture, class education, and technology. There is also an outdoor display of vehicles produced in North Korea.

History 
The museum was first established as a non-permanent Industrial and Agricultural Exhibition between 1946 and 1956, then improved to be the current Three Revolutions Exhibition in 1983. Further renovations took place in 1993, when the museum was enlarged.

See also 

 List of museums in North Korea
 Pyongyang

References

External links

The Three-Revolution Exhibition picture album at Naenara

Museums in Pyongyang
1946 establishments in Korea
Museums established in 1983